Jasper van Heertum (born 10 November 1997) is a Dutch professional footballer who plays for Bulgarian First League club Botev Plovdiv.

Club career
He made his fully professional Belgian First Division B debut for Lommel United on 8 October 2016 in a game against Tubize.

References

External links
 

1997 births
People from Valkenswaard
Living people
Dutch footballers
Dutch expatriate footballers
Lommel S.K. players
SC Telstar players
De Graafschap players
Challenger Pro League players
Eerste Divisie players
Association football defenders
Dutch expatriate sportspeople in Belgium
Expatriate footballers in Belgium
Footballers from North Brabant
Dutch expatriate sportspeople in Bulgaria
Expatriate footballers in Bulgaria
Botev Plovdiv players